Georgina Melissa "Gina" Hathorn (born 6 July 1946) is a British former alpine skier who competed in the 1964 Winter Olympics and 1968 Winter Olympics, where she finished fourth in the Slalom, and in the 1972 Winter Olympics.

References

External links
 

1946 births
Living people
British female alpine skiers
Olympic alpine skiers of Great Britain
Alpine skiers at the 1964 Winter Olympics
Alpine skiers at the 1968 Winter Olympics
Alpine skiers at the 1972 Winter Olympics